The 19th Quebec Cinema Awards ceremony was held on 4 June 2017, hosted by actors Guylaine Tremblay and Édith Cochrane, to recognize talent and achievement in the Cinema of Quebec. Formerly known as the Jutra Awards, the Prix Iris name was announced in October 2016. Several categories were also added this year, including for Casting, Visual Effects, Revelation and Documentary Editing and Cinematography, while the Billet d'or for straightforward box office performance was succeeded by the Prix du public (Public Prize), chosen by viewers' votes.

The first winners were announced at the  Gala des artisans on 1 June, with producer Lyse Lafontaine also honoured with the Iris Hommage for 30 years of contributions to the province's film industry. Xavier Dolan's It's Only the End of the World was prominent among the winners with five awards, including Best Film.

Winners and nominees
Nominees and winners are:

References

Quebec
2016 in Canadian cinema
2017 in Quebec
19